Hidden Valley Downs was a half-mile horse racing track opened in 1966 located near Medora, Reno County, Kansas. The privately owned bush track hosted informal American Quarter Horse, and Thoroughbred events. Bush tracks are unregulated by state commissions and are noted for "anything goes" racing. Many famous horses raced at the track including Kentucky Derby winner Black Gold (horse). The track gained minor notoriety after Sports Illustrated magazine published an article about the track in the October 31, 1966 edition called Anything Goes in the Bush by Jack Olsen.
The track closed in 1971 and the land remains privately owned.

References 

Defunct horse racing venues in the United States